Pete Arbogast (born December 5, 1954) is a radio announcer who is the voice of the USC Trojans. He has called football, men's basketball, and women's basketball for the Trojans and was the voice of the Cincinnati Bengals.

Biography
Arbogast was born in Chicago but grew up in Los Angeles. He graduated from John Marshall High School in 1972, attended Los Angeles City College, and graduated from USC in 1978. After graduation, he worked in Twin Falls and Victorville and was the play-by-play announcer for KTIP in Porterville. 

With the exception of a hiatus from 1994 to 2000, Arbogast has done play-by-play for the USC Trojans since the 1989 season, replacing Tom Kelly who moved to television. Arbogast took over for men's basketball duties for USC after Rory Markas died. He was the public address announcer for the Los Angeles Dodgers from 1990-1993 while also fulfilling his Trojan duties. Coincidentally, he won the audition for the job on January 25, 1990, the same day that former Dodgers public address announcer John Ramsey passed away. He left the position after the 1993 season and was permanently replaced by Mike Carlucci in 1994.   

Between the 1997 and 2000 seasons, Arbogast served as the voice of the Bengals.  

Arbogast has also announced for CBS Radio, CBS’s Olympics coverage, and Los Angeles Clippers broadcasts. Arbogast was a sports anchor for KNX and anchored the morning news for the short lived K-News in Los Angeles. His primary job as of 2018 was the youth director for the Santa Monica YMCA. He also volunteers at St. John's Health Center to comfort terminally ill patients who may die alone. 

He is a three time winner of the Southern California Sports Broadcasters radio play by play of the year award from 2018-2020 and is in that organizations Hall of Fame. He has called more Trojans football games than any other person in history.

He is the son of late broadcaster Bob Arbogast.

References

1954 births
Living people
American radio sports announcers
American television sports announcers
Cincinnati Bengals announcers
College basketball announcers in the United States
College football announcers
Los Angeles Clippers announcers
Major League Baseball public address announcers
National Basketball Association broadcasters
National Football League announcers
Women's college basketball announcers in the United States
Sportspeople from Chicago
Sportspeople from Los Angeles
Television personalities from Cincinnati
USC Trojans men's basketball announcers
USC Trojans football announcers